KO Magazine was a popular United States boxing magazine. It was first published in 1980, to compete with The Ring.

It was founded by Stanley Weston, long-time publisher of numerous boxing and pro wrestling titles.

KO Magazine, nicknamed "The Knockout Boxing Magazine", ran some popular features, such as a round-by-round section where the most important fights were described punch by punch, posters with the boxer's complete records on the back, and a question and answer interview section.

Weston wanted KO to stand out above all other boxing magazines on the market, including the ones he published. It was meant to be a rival to The Ring and outsold that magazine for years. Peter King was editor from KO's founding until his departure from the company in 1987.

Other key staff members included Steven Farhood, Richard Countis, Stu Saks, Jeff Ryan, Bill Apter and Ken Morgan.

Contributing writers included long-time boxing reporters Al Bernstein and Richard Hoffer.

Each issue contained rankings in 12 weight classes compiled by the editors.

Each issue also included letters from fans ("Between Rounds"), a color centerfold and an "International Report" which featured match results from around the world.

In September 2007, KO Magazine was acquired by Golden Boy Enterprises, along with The Ring. KO Magazine ceased publication following the acquisition.

References

Sports magazines published in the United States
Boxing magazines
Defunct magazines published in the United States
Magazines established in 1980
Magazines disestablished in 2007